George Klyne (13 August 1828 – 23 December 1906) was a Member of the Legislative Assembly of Manitoba (1871–74). Metis politician Georges Kline was first a member the Convention of Forty in 1870 representing Pointe a Grouette and then became one of the first elected MLA's in Manitoba representing the riding of Ste. Agathe. George was also a member of the Southesk Expedition in 1859.

Early life
Klyne was born at Athabasca River in 1828, son of French Canadian Michel Klyne, the HBC postmaster at Jasper House, and his Métis wife, Suzanne (née Lafrance). He had 13 siblings, including Jane Klyne, wife of Archibald McDonald of the Hudson's Bay Company. Klyne was educated at Saint Boniface, Manitoba.

Red River Rebellion
Though a Francophone Métis, Klyne was an opponent of Louis Riel in the Red River Rebellion, and in late 1869, he was imprisoned by Riel's men for thirty days. After his release in early 1870, he was chosen as a Francophone representative for Pointe-à-Grouette on the convention of forty (split evenly between Francophones and Anglophones).

General election, 1870
Klyne stood for election in 1870 for the riding of Ste. Agathe, beating his opponent, Alexander Morin, by only five votes. Klyne served one term, 1871–74. He sought election again in 1878 but was disqualified.

Personal life
On 13 January 1863, Klyne married Monique Barthelais dit Savoyard. They went on to have 14 children.

References

1828 births
1875 deaths
Members of the Legislative Assembly of Manitoba
Métis politicians